John Fitzgerald (born 21 November 1961) is a former Australian rules footballer who played with Geelong in the Victorian Football League (VFL).

Fitzgerald played under 19s football at Geelong, then instead of pursuing a VFL career played with St Joseph's in the Geelong Football League. A rover, Fitzgerald was lured back to the club in 1986 and appeared in the final five rounds of the season. He played a further three games early in the 1987 VFL season.

In 1989, Fitzgerald captained St Joseph's to a premiership and was named "best and ground" in the grand final.

He coached South Barwon from 2000 to 2003, which included a premiership in 2001. From 2007 to 2011 he was senior coach of Bell Park and steered them to a premiership in his final season. He took a break from coaching in 2012, before being named coach of Drysdale in the Bellarine Football League, for the 2013 season.

References

1961 births
Australian rules footballers from Victoria (Australia)
Geelong Football Club players
St Joseph's Football Club players
Living people